The Old Kilmore Gaol is a bluestone building in Kilmore, Victoria. It was originally built as a gaol and is located at 8 to 12 Sutherland Street.

History
Old Kilmore Gaol was built in 1857 under the supervision of Charles Pasley. It was a gaol from 1859 until 1891 when it was decommissioned and used as a butter factory. In the 1960s it became a private home and was a restaurant in the 1990s before reverting again to a private home in 2004. Today, the gaol is used for commercial purposes. Its bluestone walls and exterior appearance are the only original features that have been retained.

Heritage significance
It appears on the Heritage Council of Victoria's Victorian Heritage Database, for being "one of a small group of early Victorian prisons to be built outside of Melbourne." and "for its long use as a centre of dairy production and distribution ... and for its contribution to Kilmore's rare group of Basalt public buildings." and is listed on the Register of the National Estate.

References

1859 establishments in Australia
1891 disestablishments
Maximum security prisons in Australia
Defunct prisons in Victoria (Australia)